Hostětice is a municipality and village in Jihlava District in the Vysočina Region of the Czech Republic. It has about 100 inhabitants.

Administrative parts
The village of Částkovice is an administrative part of Hostětice.

References

Villages in Jihlava District